Immunity is a monthly peer-reviewed medical journal of immunology published by Cell Press. The journal was established in December 1994, and is edited by Peter T. Lee. According to the Journal Citation Reports, the journal has a 2020 impact factor of 31.745.

Abstracting and indexing
The journal is abstracted and indexed in:

Notes and references

External links

Immunology journals
Cell Press academic journals
Publications established in 1994
Monthly journals
English-language journals
1994 establishments in the United States